The Union Boat Club (also known as UBC), founded in 1851, is an athletic club in Boston. It is the longest continuously operating rowing club in Boston. Located in the Beacon Hill neighborhood along the Charles River, the Club has grown beyond rowing and now features squash and general fitness facilities for its 700 members.
In 1914, UBC placed second in the prestigious Grand Challenge Cup. The 1914 crew lost to Harvard after beating a crew from Germany to enter the finals at the Henley Royal Regatta.

Union is the sister club of University Barge Club of Philadelphia. For more than 60 years, the two sister clubs have held an annual interclub "UBC" regatta. In 2009, Michelle Guerette, an eight-time senior US National Team member and two-time Olympian, joined Union Boat Club  to serve as head coach.

Prominent members
Francis Cuddy - 2006 & 2007 US National Team member (Men's 2X 06' & Spare 07'), 2007 Pan American Team 
Catherine Humblet - 2000 & 2001 US National Team, 2003 Pan American Team
Greg Ruckman - 2000 & 2004 US Olympic Teams
Pete Raymond - 1972 & 1968 US Olympic Teams
Lawrence Terry - 1972 & 1968 US Olympic Teams

See also
 List of American gentlemen's clubs
 List of Charles River boathouses

References

Further reading

External links

Beacon Hill, Boston
Rowing clubs in the United States
Sports clubs established in 1851
Gentlemen's clubs in the United States
1851 establishments in Massachusetts